Vincent Lushington "Roi" Ottley (August 2, 1906 – October 2, 1960) was an American journalist and writer. Although largely forgotten today, he was among the most famous African American correspondents in the United States during the mid-20th century.

Early life

Ottley was born in New York City on August 2, 1906, to Jerome Peter and Beatrice Ottley, the second of their three children. His parents were immigrants from the Caribbean island country of Grenada. He attended public schools in the city, where he excelled in basketball, baseball, and track, and in 1926 he won a track scholarship to St. Bonaventure College in Allegany, New York. At St. Bonaventure, he was a writer and cartoonist for the campus newspaper. In 1928, he transferred to the University of Michigan to concentrate on journalism. He later studied part-time at St. John's Law School and Columbia University, both in New York City.

Career

Ottley worked as a journalist for the Amsterdam News from 1931 to 1937. In 1937, Ottley joined the New York City Writers' Project as an editor. In 1943 he published New World A-Coming: Inside Black America, which described life for African Americans in Harlem, New York City, in the 1920s and 1930s. The book incorporated Ottley's reports from the New York City Writer's Project. It won the Life in America prize, an Anisfield-Wolf Book Award and a Peabody Award, and was adapted for a series of radio broadcasts. Also the book became the basis for the anthology radio program broadcast on WMAC in New York.

Ottley became the publicity director of national CIO War Relief Committee in 1943. He was commissioned as a lieutenant in the US Army in 1944. During World War II, Ottley reported from Europe for Liberty Magazine, PM, and the Pittsburgh Courier, becoming the first African American war correspondent to cover the war for major newspapers. Ottley covered events such as the Normandy Invasion, the hanging of Mussolini, and the Arab–French conflict in Syria. He also interviewed important personalities like Governor Talmadge of Georgia, and Samuel Green, Grand Dragon of the Ku Klux Klan. Ottley also became the first African American to interview a pope when he met with Pope Pius XII in 1945.

He later worked for the Chicago Tribune and broadcast reports for CBS and BBC radio.

Ottley's other published works include Black Odyssey: The Story of the Negro in America, 1948; No Green Pastures, 1951; and Lonely Warrior: The Life and Times of Robert S. Abbot, 1955. Two were published posthumously: White Marble Lady in 1965, and The Negro in New York: An Informal Social History, 1626–1940 in 1967.

Death
Ottley died on October 2, 1960, from a heart attack.

See also
 Destination Freedom – a post-WWII anthology radio series airing in Chicago

References

Primary sources
 Ottley, Roi and Huddle, Mark A. Roi Ottley's World War II: The Lost Diary of an African American Journalist (University Press of Kansas, 2011). , 
 
 Book Discussion on Roi Ottley's World War II with Mark Huddle, June 23, 2012 – C-Span

Further reading

External links
 1944–1945 Radio Series based on Roi Ottley's New World A'Coming on archive.org

1906 births
1960 deaths
United States Army officers
United States Army personnel of World War II
Chicago Tribune people
African-American journalists
American war correspondents of World War II
Writers from New York (state)
Journalists from New York City
20th-century American non-fiction writers
University of Michigan alumni
20th-century African-American writers